Péter Zachán (born 12 December 1997) is a Hungarian football player who currently plays for Debreceni EAC.

Career

Paks
On 5 November 2016, Zachán played his first match for Paks in a 2-1 win against Ferencváros in the Hungarian League.

Career statistics

Club

References

External links

1997 births
Living people
People from Kistarcsa
Hungarian footballers
Hungarian expatriate footballers
Association football defenders
FC Hatvan footballers
Veszprém LC footballers
Paksi FC players
Dorogi FC footballers
Szekszárdi UFC footballers
Ungmennafélagið Fjölnir players
Nemzeti Bajnokság I players
Nemzeti Bajnokság II players
Hungarian expatriate sportspeople in Iceland
Expatriate footballers in Iceland
Sportspeople from Pest County